Carbethopendecinium bromide is a quaternary ammonium compound used as antiseptic and disinfectant. It is white to yellowish crystalline powder. It is well soluble in water, ethanol and chloroform; its water solutions foam strongly if shaken.

Carbethopendecinium bromide is the active substance in antiseptic and disinfecting products prepared in the Czech Republic under the trademarks Septonex (also Ophtalmo-Septonex, Mukoseptonex etc.) and Otipur. In small quantities, it is contained in other products as auxiliary substance too.

References

Antiseptics
Disinfectants
Quaternary ammonium compounds
Ethyl esters
Cationic surfactants